Spiritual transformation involves a fundamental change in a person's sacred or spiritual life.

Psychologists examine spiritual transformation within the context of an individual's meaning system, especially in relation to concepts of the sacred or of  ultimate concern. Two of the fuller treatments of the concept in psychology come from Kenneth Pargament and from Raymond Paloutzian.

Pargament holds that "at its heart, spiritual transformation refers to a fundamental change in the place of the sacred or the character of the sacred in the life of the individual. Spiritual transformation can be understood in terms of new configurations of strivings" (p. 18).

Paloutzian suggests that "spiritual transformation constitutes a change in the  meaning system that a person holds as a basis for self-definition, the interpretation of life, and overarching purposes and ultimate concerns" (p. 334).

One school of thought emphasises the importance of "rigorous self-discipline" in spiritual transformation.

Research
The Metanexus Institute (founded 1997) in New York has sponsored scientific research on spiritual transformation.

Terminology 
Occurrences of the phrase "spiritual transformation"  in Google Books suggest a surge in the popularity of the concept from the late-20th century.

See also
 Aurobindo
 Integral transformative practice
 Meditation
 Sivananda
 Spiritual evolution
 Supermind
 Transpersonal psychology
 Shriram Sharma Acharya
 Mahdi

References

External links
 The Spiritual Transformation Scientific Research Program
 The University of Philosophical Research Transformational Psychology program
 Article about Spiritual Transformation for Christians
On the Spiritual Path of The Fourth Way and Advaita:  Teachers of No-Thing & Nothing

Spiritual evolution